Stephen Thompson (born 1967) is a British playwright and screenwriter.

Background
Thompson studied at the University of Warwick. He gained a maths degree but also did some English studies in his third year. Thompson worked as a maths teacher for twelve years at Tiffin School, and was head of maths.

Thompson left teaching in 2000 and became a full-time dad and house husband to his children. He has stated this was because his wife was earning much more money than him.

Career
In an interview, Thompson said "I took a sudden left turn and became a scriptwriter.” He trained on the RADA playwrights' course, and his first play, Damages, was performed at the Bush Theatre in 2004, winning the Meyer-Whitworth Award for new writing.

In 2005, he was made Pearson writer in residence at the Bush Theatre where his next play Whipping It Up was also performed. Roaring Trade was performed by Paines Plough at the Soho Theatre. His most recent play No Naughty Bits was performed at Hampstead Theatre in September 2011.

His first credit for television came on the medical soap Doctors in 2005. Since then, he has contributed scripts for several popular shows, including Silk, Upstairs Downstairs, Doctor Who, and the first three series of Sherlock (the latter two both in collaboration with Steven Moffat). In 2016, he created the period drama series Jericho, which re-imagines the building of the Ribblehead Viaduct. In April 2016, ITV confirmed that a second series of Jericho was not going to be commissioned.

On 3 October 2018, it was announced that Thompson would be teaming with Frank Spotnitz to develop a drama about Leonardo da Vinci. On 17 February 2019, it was revealed that Thompson was developing an adaptation of Runestaff for BBC. On 16 August 2019, the BBC announced they would broadcast Thompson's adaptation of the popular Liebermann novels by Frank Tallis, Vienna Blood. On 6 July 2020, Endor Productions and MR Film announced that a second series had been jointly recommissioned by ORF, ZDF, BBC and PBS. On 22 February 2022, a third series was commissioned.

Bibliography 
 Damages, Josef Weinberger Plays, 2004.
 Whipping It Up, Nick Hern Books, 2006.
 Roaring Trade, Nick Hern Books, 2009.
 No Naughty Bits, Nick Hern Books, 2011.

Television writing credits

Personal life
Thompson is married to the media barrister Lorna Skinner  and they have five children.

References

External links
 

Living people
1967 births
Date of birth missing (living people)
Place of birth missing (living people)
English male dramatists and playwrights
English dramatists and playwrights
English television writers
British television writers
British science fiction writers
English screenwriters
English male screenwriters
British male television writers